Games and Economic Behavior (GEB) is a journal of game theory published by Elsevier.  Founded in 1989, the journal's stated objective is to communicate game-theoretic ideas across theory and applications.  It is considered to be the leading journal of game theory and one of the top journals in economics, and it is one of the two official journals of the Game Theory Society. Apart from game theory and economics, the research areas of the journal also include applications of game theory in political science, biology, computer science, mathematics and psychology. 

The editor-in-chief of GEB is Ehud Kalai. Each paper is initially assigned by GEB's chief editor to one of the seven editors (including himself). The chief editor has final decision authority.

Impact Factor
According to the Journal Citation Reports, the journal has a 2020 impact factor of 1.287 and the 5-year impact factor of 1.511.

References

Economics journals
Game theory
English-language journals
Elsevier academic journals
Academic journals associated with learned and professional societies
Publications established in 1989
Bimonthly journals